Galleh Behi (also Romanized as Galleh Behī; also known as Gol-e Behī) is a village in Margavar Rural District, Silvaneh District, Urmia County, West Azerbaijan Province, Iran. At the 2006 census, its population was 276, in 61 families.

References 

Populated places in Urmia County